Deadline is a 1987 war drama film directed by Nathaniel Gutman. It stars Christopher Walken as journalist Don Stevens, who is set up amidst the Lebanese Civil War and is fed false information. An international co-production of Israel, the United States, and West Germany, the film was shot in Israel and was released in some countries under the title Witness in the War Zone.

Plot
Ace Reporter Don Stevens (Christopher Walken) is an American journalist who goes to Beirut, Lebanon during the Lebanese Civil War. He stays in a hotel with English journalist Mike Jessop. He is promised an interview with a top PLO leader, Palestinian Yassin Abu-Riadd (Amos Lavi). However, this proves to be a set-up and he is duped into interviewing an impostor who claims the PLO are prepared to negotiate peacefully.

Outraged by this deception, Stevens becomes determined to find out the truth. In this quest he is helped by a Scandinavian doctor, Linda, who it emerges is Yassin's estranged girlfriend. Along the way, Stevens is hindered by everyone around him: The PLO threaten him, the Phalangists arrest him and the Israelis ignore him. Tricked and beaten, he gradually uncovers a murder plot, double agents, the bombing of the Phalangists headquarters and, most terrifying of all, a plan to massacre hundreds of civilians. In a story that takes the lid off events in Lebanon, Don Stevens becomes a reluctant hero, and in doing so, gets the scoop of a lifetime.

Cast
 Christopher Walken as Don Stevens
 Marita Marschall as Linda Larsen
 Hywel Bennett as Mike Jessop
 Arnon Zadok as Hamdi Abu-Yussuf
 Amos Lavi as Yassin Abu-Riadd
 Etti Ankri as Samira
 Martin Umbach as Bernard
 Moshe Ivgy as Abdul
 Sasson Gabai as Bossam

Reception

Awards
Christopher Walken won the Magnolia Award for "Best Actor" at the Shanghai Television Festival.

See also
Sabra and Shatila massacre

References

External links

1987 films
1980s war drama films
American political drama films
English-language Israeli films
English-language German films
Films about journalists
Films about war correspondents
Israeli war drama films
Israeli–Palestinian conflict films
Lebanese Civil War films
1980s political thriller films
West German films
American war drama films
Films set in Lebanon
Films shot in Israel
1987 drama films
1980s English-language films
1980s American films